Kathryn Ann Hall is an Australian politician. She has been a Labor Party member of the Victorian Legislative Assembly since November 2018, representing the seat of Footscray.

Before her election, she was a corporate communications specialist.

Originally a member of Labor Right, Hall defected to Labor Left along with six of her colleagues shortly after the 2022 Victorian state election; the defections of her colleagues and herself meant that Labor Left constituted a majority of the state Labor caucus.

References

Year of birth missing (living people)
Living people
Australian Labor Party members of the Parliament of Victoria
Members of the Victorian Legislative Assembly
Women members of the Victorian Legislative Assembly
21st-century Australian politicians
Labor Left politicians
21st-century Australian women politicians